Nancy Justine McKeon (born April 4, 1966) is an American actress. She is known for her roles as Jo Polniaczek on the NBC sitcom The Facts of Life and Jinny Exstead on The Division.

Early life and family
Nancy Justine McKeon was born on April 4, 1966, in Westbury, New York to  Donald McKeon, a travel agent, and Barbara McKeon. She began her entertainment career by modeling baby clothing for the Sears & Roebuck catalog when she was two. During some of her childhood, the family resided in Forest Hills, New York in Queens.

Along with her brother, Philip McKeon, she performed in many commercials. In 1976, her brother was chosen to play a major role on the television show, Alice. As a result, the family moved to Los Angeles, California.

Career

Youth
Nancy McKeon appeared on the soap operas The Secret Storm and Another World. In 1979, she was discovered by a casting director for The Facts of Life on the basis of her performance in a Hallmark advertisement, in which she was able to cry on cue.

She was cast as tomboy Jo Polniaczek in the fall of 1980 during the show's second season after four of the first season's cast (including Molly Ringwald) were dismissed from the show. This is considered to be her most well-known role. She portrayed the character until the show ended in 1988. McKeon also provided the voice for many ABC Weekend Special cartoon characters, including the voice for Scruffy.

While she was working on The Facts of Life, McKeon attended school on-set with tutors, having attended Catholic school prior to that. In an interview with Tom Snyder in 1998, she joked that she "was given detention a few times" for not adhering to the strict rules of school, which included not wearing her favorite patent leather shoes.

Adulthood
Following The Facts of Life, McKeon was courted by NBC executives for the title role in the TV sitcom adaptation of the 1988 film Working Girl; the role, played by Melanie Griffith in the movie, instead went to then unknown Sandra Bullock. In 1994, McKeon and Courteney Cox auditioned for the role of Monica Geller on the  sitcom Friends. The role went to Cox. When asked in interviews about the audition, McKeon said, "I have no hard feelings. The role went to the right person. Courteney was brilliant. Now, I can't see anybody playing the role, not even myself." In 1995, she starred in her own series, Can't Hurry Love, which lasted one season. In 1998, she starred with Jean Smart in the sitcom Style & Substance. 

McKeon portrayed Inspector Jinny Exstead on the Lifetime police drama The Division from 2001 to 2004, with her pregnancy incorporated into the storyline of the last year of the series. From 2009 to 2010, she appeared in a recurring role in the Disney Channel Original Series Sonny with a Chance as Connie Munroe, the mother of Demi Lovato's title character.

McKeon starred in numerous made-for-TV movies in the 1980s and 1990s, including A Cry for Help: The Tracey Thurman Story, in which she portrayed the title role of Tracey Thurman, and The Wrong Woman, portraying a woman framed for killing her boss. In Strange Voices, she portrayed a woman with schizophrenia. She produced many of these movies through her film company, Forest Hills Entertainment (named after her childhood neighborhood, Forest Hills).
 
McKeon carefully researched roles and characters. For her role in The Division, she spent time with a police force, while for her role in Strange Voices, she spoke with patients about the condition to prepare for her role. In an interview with John Tesh, she said, "What's really interesting is that I find that people are very forthcoming to actors. I mean, almost more forthcoming than they are to priests or shrinks, because they somehow feel that their story is going to be out there in someway...But, once you get into talking with them and finding out about their world, it's fascinating and it's heartbreaking at the same time."

In 1999, she wrote and directed her own short film, A Wakening. She explained on the TV show Biography that directing had always been a personal ambition, so she wrote the movie in order to direct. The film won two film festival awards. She also directed two episodes of The Division. 

In 2003, McKeon starred in the film Comfort and Joy. In 2018, McKeon was announced as one of the celebrities to compete on season 27 of Dancing with the Stars. She was partnered with professional dancer Valentin Chmerkovskiy, and was the third celebrity eliminated.

McKeon has narrated several audiobooks.

She has a brief cameo appearance in 2019's You Light Up My Christmas, a movie starring her Facts of Life co-star Kim Fields. The movie includes other cast members from the show. McKeon was supposed to have a larger role in the movie, but was unable to film more due to a family emergency. Also in 2019, McKeon announced on social media her involvement in a new, planned Amazon series based on the Lauren Oliver young adult novel Panic. The first season premiered in 2021.

Personal life
While McKeon was on The Facts of Life, she and her parents were granted a private audience with Pope John Paul II. She described the experience to interviewer Tom Snyder in 1998 as "electric," explaining, "In every rendering of every artist, you see this aura that's painted around figures...He has that in life."

McKeon dated actor Michael J. Fox for three years after they met on the set of High School U.S.A. (1983). "He and I were very private people," McKeon told Biography. "We didn't tell a lot of people, and we kind of kept to ourselves." McKeon and Fox appeared together as a celebrity couple on the game show Tattletales.

In 2003,  McKeon married film technician Marc Andrus, after meeting eight years prior on the set of the Hallmark movie, A Mother’s Gift. A private pair seeking to keep the event small, the two only had 20 guests at the wedding. They moved to a ranch near Austin, Texas, to raise their two daughters, born in 2004 and 2006, out of the spotlight.

Filmography

Film

Television

Awards and nominations
Marco Island Film Festival
2000: Won, "Audience Award for Best Short Drama"—A Wakening
2000: Won, "Crystal Palm Award for Best Short Film"—A Wakening

Prism Awards
2003: Nominated, "Best Performance in a Drama Series Episode"—The Division
2003: Nominated, "Best Performance in a Drama Series"—The Division
2004: Nominated, "Best Performance in a Drama Series Multi Episode Storyline"—The Division

TV Land Awards
2007: Nominated, "The 'When Bad Teens Go Good' Award"—The Facts of Life

Young Artist Awards
1982: Nominated, "Best Young Comedienne in Motion Picture or Television"—The Facts of Life
1983: Won, "Best Young Actress in a Television Special"—Please Don't Hit Me, Mom
1983: Won, "Best Young Actress in a Movie Made for Television"—The Facts of Life Goes to Paris
1983: Won, "Best Young Actress in a Comedy Series"—The Facts of Life
1984: Nominated, "Best Young Actress in a Comedy Series"—The Facts of Life

References

External links

Nancy McKeon on Twitter
Nancy McKeon on Instagram

1966 births
20th-century American actresses
21st-century American actresses
Actresses from New York (state)
American child actresses
American film actresses
Film producers from New York (state)
American television actresses
American voice actresses
People from Westbury, New York
Living people
American women film producers
Actresses from Burbank, California